This is a list of temples of Poseidon.

Greece
 Temple of Poseidon at Kalaureia
 Temple of Poseidon at Sounion
 Temple of Isthmia
 Temple of Poseidon (Tainaron)

Italy 
 Temple of Poseidon (Colonna Reggina)
 Temple of Poseidon (Taranto)
 Second Temple of Hera (Paestum)

Turkey
 Panionium

See also 
Temple of Neptune (disambiguation)